Henricus Franciscus Wierix (1784 – 1858), was a 19th-century painter from the Northern Netherlands.

Biography
He was born in Amsterdam and became the pupil of the genre painter Jacobus Johannes Lauwers and after he died in 1800, of Lauwers' brother-in-law Johannes de Frey. He then studied perspective under Pieter Pietersz Barbiers and began to make landscapes. He won gold medals for his drawings of nudes from Kunst Zij Ons Doel and Felix Meritis in 1809, 1810, and 1811. He moved to Nijmegen in 1811 and is known for landscapes and portraits and taught Christiaan Wilhelmus Moorrees.
He died in Nijmegen.

References

Henricus Franciscus Wierix on Artnet

1784 births
1858 deaths
19th-century Dutch painters
Dutch male painters
Painters from Amsterdam
19th-century Dutch male artists